Brockdorff is a name of a Schleswig-Holsteiner ancient noble house that belonged to German and Danish nobility.

History 
It first appeared in a document from 1167 where Eilwardus de Bruchthorp was mentioned by Duke Henry the Lion of Saxony. Members of the family founded Brokdorf, Holstein, now part of Germany, from where the family originated.

Titles 
On 24.5.1672 the family was granted the title of Lensgreve by King Christian V of Denmark heritable by masculine primogeniture, while on 03.6.1706 the family was awarded with the title of Imperial Count by Joseph I, Holy Roman Emperor. Later, in 19th century the family also obtained the title of Count in Prussia.

Properties and former properties of the Counts von Brockdorff

Notable People 
Joachim von Brockdorff (1643–1719), father of:
Anna Constantia von Brockdorff, Countess of Cosel, mistress of Augustus the Strong.
Baron Joachim von Brockdorff, who built the Brockdorff's Palace
Count Cay Lorenz von Brockdorff (1766–1840), Last Chancellor of Schleswig-Holstein and first High Court President of Schleswig-Holstein
Count Cay Lorenz von Brockdorff (1844–1921), grandson of above, German anthroposophist
Count Cay von Brockdorff, German Sculptor, himself a count, grandson of above, Erika's husband
Countess Erika von Brockdorff (1911–1943) German resistance fighter against the Nazi régime during World War II, herself a countess by marriage
Count Charles Frederick von Brocktorff, (1775/85–1850) painter
Count Walter von Brockdorff-Ahlefeldt, (1887–1943) German general in World War II
Count Ulrich von Brockdorff-Rantzau, (1869–1928) German diplomat

See also
Brockdorff's Palace

External links
Family Tree at roskildehistorie.dk 

Danish noble families
German noble families